Eithne is a female personal name of Irish origin, meaning "kernel" or "grain". Other spellings and earlier forms include Ethnea, Ethlend, Ethnen, Ethlenn, Ethnenn, Eithene, Ethne, Aithne, Enya, Ena, Edna, Etney, Eithnenn, Eithlenn, Eithna, Ethni, Edlend, Edlenn.

The name is popular in Ireland, and is borne by a variety of historical and legendary figures.

Ancient

 Ethniu, daughter of Balor and mother of Lug in Irish mythology
 Eithne and Sodelb, Leinster saints
 Eithne, daughter of the king of Alba, wife of the High King Fiacha Finnfolaidh and mother of Tuathal Teachtmhar
 Eithne, the mother of Saint Columba
 Eithne Tháebfhota, third wife of Conn Cétchathach

Modern
 Eithne Coyle, Irish republican activist
 Eithne Farry, former literary editor of Elle
 Eithne Fitzgerald, Irish economist and former Labour Party politician
 Eithne Hannigan, Irish musician and actress who played one of five Dots in the children's TV show Playbus (later Playdays)
 Eithne Ní Uallacháin, singer and musician
 Eithne Walls, a physician and former dancer, who danced with the popular Riverdance group on Broadway, died in the Air France Flight 447 crash on 1 June 2009
 Eithne Ní Bhraonáin (Enya), musician
 LÉ Eithne, a ship in the Irish Naval Service

See also
List of Irish-language given names

References

Irish-language feminine given names